CWTP may refer to:

 John J. Carroll Water Treatment Plant, a water treatment plant for Greater Boston, USA
 China West Technology Park, a science park in Guiyang, China
 Christchurch Wastewater Treatment Plant, a wastewater treatment plant in Christchurch, New Zealand